In mathematics, the term profinite is used for

 profinite groups, topological groups
 profinite sets, also known as "profinite spaces" or "Stone spaces"